W34DV-D, virtual and UHF digital channel 34, is a low-powered, Class A independent television station licensed to Booneville, Mississippi, United States. The station is owned by the Unity Broadcasting Network. The station is available on Comcast, MaxxSouth, and Ustream.

Coverage areas
Booneville, Mississippi
Jumpertown, Mississippi
Baldwyn, Mississippi
Rienzi, Mississippi

References

External links
Unity Broadcasting Website

34DV-D
Television channels and stations established in 1984
Low-power television stations in the United States